Voy a pasármelo bien is the fifth studio album recorded by Spanish rock band Hombres G, released in 1989.

Track listing

Personnel 

 David Summers – vocals, bass
 Rafa Gutiérrez – guitar
 Daniel Mezquita – guitar
 Javier Molina – drums

References

External links
 Official site
 Discography

1989 albums
Hombres G albums